Dimche Sarvanov, also Dimko Mogilcheto or Dimche Mogilche (Bulgarian/Macedonian: Димче Сарванов) (born: 1879, Mogila, Ottoman Empire, died: Nošpal, Ottoman Empire, January 4, 1908), was a Macedonian Bulgarian revolutionary and a member of the Internal Macedonian-Adrianople Revolutionary Organization. 

Sarvanov was born in Mogila (now in the North Macedonia) in 1879. He joined Georgi Sugarev's group within IMRO, and fought against Ottoman rule in the Bitola and Mariovo districts. During the Ilinden–Preobrazhenie Uprising, Sarvanov fought in the Pelister and Prespa districts. After the death of Sugarev, Sarvanov continued fighting "Greek propaganda".

On January 4, 1908 Sarvanov fell into an Ottoman ambush in the village of Nošpal, which is (close to Bitola in present-day North Macedonia), and rather than allowing himself to fall into Ottoman hands, committed suicide.

He was buried in the cemetery in the yard of the then Bulgarian Exarchate Church "Sveta Nedelya" in Bitola.

References

1879 births
1908 deaths
Members of the Internal Macedonian Revolutionary Organization
Bulgarian revolutionaries
Macedonian Bulgarians
1908 suicides
Revolutionaries from the Ottoman Empire